Albarelli is a surname. Notable people with the surname include:

 Fabio Albarelli (1943–1995), Italian competitive sailor
 Giacomo Albarelli, Italian painter

See also
 Albarello (disambiguation)
 Albarello (surname)